Cowlitz may refer to:

People
 Cowlitz people, an indigenous people of the Pacific Northwest
 Cowlitz language, member of the Tsamosan branch of the Coast Salish family of Salishan languages
 Cowlitz Indian Tribe, a federally recognized tribe of Cowlitz people

Places
 Cowlitz County, Washington
 Cowlitz Falls Dam, a 70 megawatt hydroelectric dam in Lewis County, Washington
 Cowlitz Chimneys
 Cowlitz Glacier
 Cowlitz Landing, Washington, former name of Toledo, Washington
 Cowlitz River, a tributary of the Columbia River
 Cowlitz–Natches Road

Other
 Columbia and Cowlitz Railroad
 Cowlitz Black Bears, baseball team
 Cowlitz (HBC vessel), see Hudson's Bay Company vessels